Propebela rugulata (common name : Gould's northern turrid) is a species of sea snail, a marine gastropod mollusc in the family Mangeliidae.

Description
The whorls are angulated; the axial ribs straight, and not sigmoid. The length of the aperture is about the same as that of the spire. The angulated part of the ultimate whorl is sharp. The apex has a somewhat flattened protoconch. The first whorl has two prominent spiral ribs. The teeth of the radula vary, from broad-coniform to elongate-coniform

Distribution
This marine species occurs from Greenland to Massachusetts, USA. Fossils have been found in Quaternary strata of Iceland, age range: 2.588 to 0.012 Ma

References

 Brunel, P.; Bosse, L.; Lamarche, G. (1998). Catalogue of the marine invertebrates of the estuary and Gulf of St. Lawrence. Canadian Special Publication of Fisheries and Aquatic Sciences, 126. 405 p.
 Abbott R. T. (1974). American seashells. The marine Mollusca of the Atlantic and Pacific coast of North America. ed. 2. Van Nostrand, New York. 663 pp., 24 pls
 Bogdanov, I. P. Mollusks of Oenopotinae subfamily (Gastropoda, Pectinibranchia, Turridae) in the seas of the USSR. Nauka, 1990.
 Gofas, S.; Le Renard, J.; Bouchet, P. (2001). Mollusca. in: Costello, M.J. et al. (eds), European Register of Marine Species: a check-list of the marine species in Europe and a bibliography of guides to their identification. Patrimoines Naturels. 50: 180–213.

External links
 Verrill A. E. (1882). Catalogue of marine Mollusca added to the fauna of the New England region, during the past ten years. Transactions of the Connecticut Academy of Arts and Sciences 5(2): 447-587 pl. 57-58
 
  Vermeij, Geerat J. "From Europe to America: Pliocene to recent trans-Atlantic expansion of cold-water North Atlantic molluscs." Proceedings of the Royal Society of London B: Biological Sciences 272.1580 (2005): 2545–2550.
 Nekhaev, Ivan O., and Ekaterina N. Krol. "Diversity of shell-bearing gastropods along the western coast of the Arctic archipelago Novaya Zemlya: an evaluation of modern and historical data." Polar Biology 40.11 (2017): 2279–2289.
 Nekhaev, Ivan O. "Marine shell-bearing Gastropoda of Murman (Barents Sea): an annotated check-list." Ruthenica 24.2 (2014): 75

rugulata
Gastropods described in 1846